Eric Sprague (18 September 1894 – 13 September 1947) was an Australian rules footballer who played with Essendon in the Victorian Football League (VFL).

Notes

External links 
		

1894 births
1947 deaths
Australian rules footballers from Victoria (Australia)
Essendon Football Club players
Australian Army personnel of World War II
Australian Army soldiers